Segah (or Sigah; Persian: سه‌گاه) is the name of a Dastgah (musical mode) in Persian and related systems of music.

Segah (From Persian se-gāh, سه + گاه = سه‌گاه "third place") is named because the maqam starts on the third degree in relation to the "basic" "Magham" scale found in Rast. Sigah features a half-flat tonic and a half-flat fifth scale degree; as such, it has an unstable sound that tends to favor its own third degree, found on a whole tone.

Middle eastern Sephardic Jews make heavy use of this in their liturgy. For the prayers during Parashas Bo, Beha'alotecha, and Eqeb, parashas that are the "third" in their respective books, maqam Sigah is used. It is also applied on holidays. This maqam is linked to the holiday of Purim due to the abundance of pizmonim related to the holiday in this maqam (no doubt because the maqam is of Persian origin, and the events of the book of Esther take place in Persia). This maqam is also of importance because it is the maqam that is always used for the cantillation of the Torah.

Related maqamat are Huzam and Iraq.

See also
Dastgah

References

External links
Sikah page from Maqam World

Modes (music)